Acta Histriae  is a peer-reviewed academic journal covering the contemporary history. It is published by the Historical Society of Southern Primorska of Koper, based in Koper and the editor-in-chief is Darko Friš. The journal was established in 1993.

Journal "publishes original scientific articles in the field of humanities and historiography in particular", with primary focus on the Istria and Mediterranean Slovenia.

Abstracting and indexing
The journal is abstracted and indexed in:
Social Sciences Citation Index (SSCI), 
 Arts and Humanities Citation Index (A&HCI)
 Journal Citation Reports, Social Sciences Edition
 Scopus (2009-2020)
 European Reference Index for the Humanities and Social Sciences (ERIH PLUS)
 Internationale Bibliographie der Zeitschriftenliteratur
 International Bibliography of the Social Sciences
 Referativnyi Zhurnal Viniti
 Directory of Open Access Journals

See also 
List of academic journals published in Slovenia
Zgodovinski časopis

References

External links

History journals
Publications established in 1993
Academic journals of Slovenia
Slovene-language journals
Academic journals published in Slovenia